Old Hungarian may refer to:

Old Hungarian language
Old Hungarian alphabet
Old Hungarian (Unicode block)